Canarian United Left (IUC) is the Canarian federation of the Spanish left wing political and social movement United Left. Ramón Trujillo is the current General Coordinator. The Communist Party of the Canaries (PCC-PCE, Canarian federation of PCE) is the major member of the coalition.

Organization
ICU has assemblies in the islands of Lanzarote, La Palma, Fuerteventura, Gran Canaria, Tenerife and El Hierro. The organization had an electoral pact with Socialists for Tenerife (SxT), a split of PSOE in the island of Tenerife, between 2011 and 2015.

See also
United Left (Spain)
Canarias Decide
Communist Party of the Canaries

References

External links
Official page

Canary Islands
Political parties in the Canary Islands